Farnham United Breweries F.C. was an English association football club which participated in the FA Cup.

References

Defunct football clubs in England
Defunct football clubs in Hampshire
Works association football teams in England